Peckhammer TV was an Internet TV show that premiered on YouTube on February 5, 2008, and ran until November 2010, with one final episode posted on April 6, 2013. The motorcycle-themed shows often included educational content. Peckhammer TV was produced by David E. Aldrich, a Seattle-based documentary director, cinematographer and independent motorsports journalist.

Peckhammer TV was created by David Aldrich, AKA Peckhammer, who was the writer, director, editor and producer.  Aldrich is known in the new media field for his early work in podcasting. Together with his assistant producer, Juliette Pezé ("Girl Wonder"), the two flew around the United States to document the industry and interview notable riders such as racing great Eddie Mulder, and Hollywood stunt woman Alisa Hensley-Lane.
 
Peckhammer TV operated as an independent, self-financed, nonprofit project. Peckhammer focused on stories that were not usual for television, such as racing support teams. This, and the fact that assistant producer Pezé is tri-lingual and could conduct interviews in several languages, made the show notable.

Peckhammer TV debuted in 2008, and gained an international following. New webisodes were released monthly via several online outlets.  The webisode "Bob Milewsky, 2008 Chehalis Classic" was written about in Racer X online magazine. Peckhammer TV videos hosted on YouTube have received more than 1,000,000 views.

Episodes

Season 1 (2008)
Making a Custom Motorcycle Seat
BMW R1200R: Windshield Basics
Part One: The Moped Aesthetic
Part Two: Rust to Glory, Moped Maintenance Tips
Part Three: Unleash The Beast, Moped Performance Tuning
Interview: Chuck Graves, of Team Graves Yamaha Supermoto
Interview: David Joy, Troy Lee Designs Honda Supermoto Team
Interview: Richard Harrison, Race engineer, ATK Supermoto
Interview: Paul Adams, PPIHC Motorcycle Mechanic
Interview: Alan Heffernan, Desert Racer
Interview: Team MAX BMW at PPIHC 
Interview: Eddie Mulder, Racing Legend 
Interview: Glenn Cox, "Lucky 13"
Interview: Team Les Marluches (French Language Version)
Interview: Bob Milewsky, 2008 Chehalis Classic
Les Triplettes de Bonneville (French Language Version)
Zachary Norman and His Amazing Electric Motorcycle
Randy Smith, The BMW R75/5 Bonneville Racer
Texas Panhead Blazes Its Way Into The Record Books
Alan Thoresen: Black Thunder at Bonneville
Bonneville: Passion, Endurance and Teamwork
Dave Terrell's Day in the Dirt

Season 2 (2009)

Eddie Mulder's Triumphant Garage
Alisa Hensley-Lane, Stunt Professional
Touratech
Trials First, Trials Last
Quick Rides: 2009 Moto Guzzi V7 Classic
Jack Renolds: Blazing New Trails in the Motorcycle Rental Landscape
Maximum Exposure: Rigging a Motorcycle with FilmTools
Profiles in Vintage Racing: Keith Speir
The Art of Perseverance: Glenn Cox
Nine-Sixty-Eight: Brianne Corn
Battery Powered, Ferrari Fast: Jon Taylor, Tesla Motors
Michael Lewis: Going Nomad

Season 3 (2010)

Hips, Grips, Bars, Risers, and Seats
Engineering For Adventure
Dave Preston, Managing Team Ride West
Quick Rides: 2010 Royal Enfield C5 Bullet
A Strategy For Every Ride
AltRider Reviews: 2010 BMW R1200GS
Short Track: The Digger Helm National
Yamaha XT1200Z Super Ténéré

Final Show
2013 BMW R1200GS, And That's a Wrap!

Notable Interviews
Peckhammer interviewed, in Interview: Eddie Mulder, Racing Legend, Eddie Mulder, who is known for being a leading TT Steeplechase and desert racer of the 1960s, and a Hollywood stunt rider doubling Clint Eastwood on a motorcycle jump stunt in Magnum Force. Eddie Mulder was inducted into the AMA Motorcycle Hall of Fame in 1999. The interview took place prior to Mulder racing at the Pikes Peak International Hill Climb where he holds several records. Mulder, who was sixty-four years old at the time of the interview, discussed the altitude-related health problems he suffered after setting a record in the Vintage Class at PPIHC in 2007.

Peckhammer interviewed, in Bonneville: Passion, Endurance and Teamwork, Paul and Barbara Friebus regarding their motorcycle performances at the Bonneville Salt Flats. The Friebuses build and restore vintage motorcycles and engines and hold multiple motorcycle land speed records with their bikes.
Paul Friebus' father, who set a new land speed record at the age of 83, was also interviewed.

Peckhammer did a collaborative webisode with cinematographer Stan McClain entitled, Maximum Exposure: Rigging a Motorcycle with Film Tools. Stan McClain is known for his major studio work as a 2nd unit Director of Photography and Aerial Cinematographer for TV shows such as Magnum PI, and more than fifty motion pictures.

Notes

External links
Show web page
Official Web Blog

American non-fiction web series
YouTube channels launched in 2008
Video podcasts
Motorcycle television series
American news websites
2000s YouTube series
2010s YouTube series